Tillandsia ignesiae is a bromeliad species in the genus Tillandsia. This species is native to Mexico.

References

ignesiae
Flora of Mexico